The Synagogue of the Sephardic Jewish Community is a synagogue in Montevideo, Uruguay.

Overview
The Sephardic Community has been present in Montevideo since the first decades of the 20th century. This temple opened its doors in 1956 with the name Beth Israel; it was inspired by the Portuguese Synagogue of New York.

See also
 List of synagogues in Uruguay

References

Synagogues in Montevideo
Sephardi Jewish culture in Uruguay
Sephardi synagogues
Ciudad Vieja, Montevideo
Synagogues completed in 1956